Chad Gervich is a published author, television writer and producer, and playwright.

Gervich has produced and written for shows such After Lately, Dog With a Blog, Cupcake Wars, and Wipeout. He has written Small Screen, Big Picture: A Writers Guide to the TV Business, "How to Manage Your Agent: A Writer's Guide to Hollywood Representation", and "Psych's Guide to Crime Fighting for the Totally Unqualified".

References

External links
Chad Gervich biography on Amazon

American dramatists and playwrights
American television producers
American television writers
American male television writers
Living people
American male dramatists and playwrights
Year of birth missing (living people)